Ahmad al-Zein was a notable Sunni Muslim scholar who was also known as "Shaykh of the Levant". He was the head of the Union of Muslim Ulama of Lebanon.

Early life 
He was born in 1933 in the city of Sidon in southern Lebanon. Ahmad al-Zein was a graduate of Al-Azhar University in Egypt and was the religious judge of the Lebanese Sharia courts for 35 years and the Friday Imam of the Omri Kabir Mosque in Sidon.
He was one of Lebanon's leading Sunni scholars, a member of The World Forum for Proximity of Islamic Schools of Thought.

Death
He died on March 2, 2021, at the age of 88.

References

1933 births
2021 deaths
People from Sidon
Al-Azhar University alumni
Islam and politics
Islamism
Islamic philosophers
Muslim reformers
20th-century Muslim scholars of Islam